Magnús Gissurarson (c. 1175–1236;) was an Icelandic Roman Catholic clergyman, who became the eighth bishop of Iceland from 1216 to 1237. He served in the diocese of Skálholt.

Magnús Gissurarson was married and had two sons.

See also
List of Skálholt bishops

External links

13th-century Roman Catholic bishops in Iceland
1170s births
1236 deaths
Married Roman Catholic bishops
13th-century Icelandic people